Cluttering may refer to the following:

Cluttering, the speech disorder characterized by a speech rate that is perceived to be abnormally rapid, irregular, or both for the speaker.
Cluttered speech, which is disorganized, hurried speech, which sounds like the speech of someone with the disorder but occurs in people without speech problems
Stuttering, a speech disorder that sounds like cluttering, and a common word for cluttered speech.
Cluttering (organization), which means filling your personal space with tat or clutter.